France 3 Midi-Pyrénées is a regional television service and part of the France 3 network. Serving the Occitanie regions from its headquarters in Toulouse, secondary production centre in Montpellier and newsrooms in Perpignan, Rodez, Albi and Nîmes, France 3 Sud broadcasts regional news, sport, features and entertainment programming in French, Occitan and Catalan.

History 
In 1975 FR3 Sud was launched. Following the establishment of France Télévisions on 7 September 1992, FR3 Sud was rebranded to France 3 Sud.

Programming

News
France 3 Sud produces daily news programmes for its two sub-regions - programming for the Midi-Pyrénées sub-region is produced in Toulouse, with the Languedoc-Roussillon sub-region receiving programming from Montpellier. Each sub-region produces a 27-minute bulletin (midi-pile) at 1200 CET during 12|13 and the main news at 1900 during 19|20. Six 10-minute local bulletins serving the Toulouse, Pays Catalan, Montpellier, Quercy-Rouergue, Tarn and Pays Gardois areas are broadcast during 19|20 at 1845 CET.

On 5 January 2009, a 5-minute late night bulletin was introduced, forming part of Soir 3.

On some weekends and holiday periods, as well as during major events, the Midi-Pyrénées and Languedoc-Roussillon news bulletins are combined into pan-regional "Sud" editions.

Non-news programmes
 Viure al pais, programme in Occitan and Catalan.
 C'est mieux le matin. breakfast programme.
 Le Mag, information programme.
 Rugby Magazine
 Sud Courses

External links 

 Official site 

03 Sud
Television channels and stations established in 1975
Mass media in Toulouse
Mass media in Montpellier